Tunc may refer to:

 Tunç, a Turkish given name and surname
 Irène Tunc (1935–1972), French actress and model
 Tunc, one of the two novels comprising The Revolt of Aphrodite by Lawrence Durrell